The Dar ul-Ihsan Mosque Or Jameh Mosque of Sananda dates from the Qajar dynasty and is located in Sanandaj.

Gallery

References

Buildings and structures in Kurdistan Province
Mosques in Iran
Mosque buildings with domes
National works of Iran